Acantholipes singularis is a species of moth in the family Erebidae. It is found in Uzbekistan.

References

singularis
Moths described in 1931
Moths of Asia